Vismia torrei is a species of flowering plant in the family Hypericaceae. It was described in 1969. It is endemic to Mozambique.

References

torrei
Plants described in 1969
Flora of Mozambique